Peter Vecsey (born 1943) is an American sports columnist and analyst, specializing in basketball. In his childhood, he attended Archbishop Molloy High School, in Queens, New York, and graduated in 1961. Vecsey had written a column on the NBA for the New York Post. He was formerly an analyst for TBS and NBC and is currently an analyst for NBA TV. His writing style has been described as vicious, combative and containing cruel wit. In the 1960s, he served in the United States Army Special Forces.

Vecsey's column in the New York Post frequently detailed behind the scenes trade maneuvers as well as spotlighting many rumors in the NBA.

Vecsey is also known for his open criticism of players. Common players he has criticized include Charles Barkley, Danny Fortson, Danny Ainge, Byron Scott, the New Jersey Nets, Larry Brown, Alonzo Mourning, the Los Angeles Clippers, the New York Knicks, the Cleveland Cavaliers, Vin Baker, Shawn Kemp, and former Nets star Jayson Williams. He gave number one draft pick Joe Barry Carroll the nickname 'Joe Barely Cares', as well as dubbing former 1980s Knicks player Larry Demic 'EpiDemic' after he failed to live up to expectations.

Vecsey is the younger brother of The New York Times sports columnist George Vecsey.

He received the Basketball Hall of Fame's Curt Gowdy Media Award in 2009.

References

External links
Turner Sports - NBA - Peter Vecsey
New York Post - NBA - Peter Vecsey

1943 births
Living people
Sportswriters from New York (state)
National Basketball Association broadcasters
American reporters and correspondents
New York Post people
Archbishop Molloy High School alumni